Dr.  Darlando Thanmi Khathing is the present Vice Chancellor of North East Christian University. He was also the first Vice Chancellor of Central University of Jharkhand.

Career
Khathing is a retired Professor of Physics at the North-Eastern Hill University. From 2009 to 2014, Khathing served as the Vice-Chancellor of the Central University of Jharkhand.

Awards
 Conferred Honorary D. Sc by USTM

References

External links
 
 

Living people
Year of birth missing (living people)
Naga people
Date of birth missing (living people)
Place of birth missing (living people)
St. Stephen's College, Delhi alumni
Academic staff of the North-Eastern Hill University